The discography of Dev, an American singer and rapper, consists of two studio albums, one mixtape, three extended plays (one as a split EP), nine singles as a solo artist, as well as 12 as a featured artist. Dev was signed to Universal Republic, her debut single, Bass Down Low featuring The Cataracs, was released on December 6, 2010, later becoming part of her debut studio album The Night the Sun Came Up released in 2011, along with the hit-single "In the Dark" and the duet with Enrique Iglesias: "Naked". Dev has also released two EPs, Bittersweet July and the following second part in 2014. Both projects include the singles "Honey Dip" and "Parade".

In 2016, Dev released "Lowkey" and "#1" featuring Nef the Pharaoh, the latter peaked at 15 on the Billboard Rhythmic chart.

In 2017, Dev released her second studio album I Only See You When I'm Dreamin' on September 8. It includes "All I Wanna Do", "Trouble", "Drunk Texting" and "Come at Me".

Albums

Studio albums
{| class="wikitable plainrowheaders" style="text-align:center;"
|-
! scope="col" rowspan="2"| Album title
! scope="col" rowspan="2"| Album details
! scope="col" colspan="4"| Peak chart positions
|-
! scope="col" style="width:3em;font-size:90%;"|US
! scope="col" style="width:3em;font-size:90%;"|USD/E
! scope="col" style="width:3em;font-size:90%;"|CAN
! scope="col" style="width:3em;font-size:90%;"|UK
|-
! scope="row" | The Night the Sun Came Up
|
Released: August 31, 2011
Label: Universal Republic
Formats: CD, digital download
| 61 || 6 || 67 || 136
|-
! scope="row" | I Only See You When I'm Dreamin'''
|
Released: September 8, 2017
Label: Independent
Formats: CD, digital download
| — || — || — || —
|}

Mixtapes
 Is Hot: The Mixtape (2011)

Extended plays

Singles
As lead artist
{| class="wikitable plainrowheaders" style="text-align:center;" border="1"
|+ List of singles as lead artist, with selected chart positions and certifications, showing year released and album name
! rowspan="2" scope="col" style="width:20em;" | Title
! rowspan="2" scope="col" style="width:1em;" | Year
! colspan="8" scope="col" | Peak chart positions
! rowspan="2" scope="col" style="width:14em;" | Certifications
! rowspan="2" scope="col" style="width:18em;" | Album
|-
! scope="col" style="width:3em;font-size:85%;" |US
! scope="col" style="width:3em;font-size:85%;" |USDance
! scope="col" style="width:3em;font-size:85%;" |USRhy.
! scope="col" style="width:3em;font-size:85%;" |AUS 
! scope="col" style="width:3em;font-size:85%;" |CAN
! scope="col" style="width:3em;font-size:85%;" |DEN
! scope="col" style="width:3em;font-size:85%;" |IRL
! scope="col" style="width:3em;font-size:85%;" |UK
|-
! scope="row" |"Bass Down Low"(featuring The Cataracs)
| 2010
| 61 || — || 24 || 66 || 35 || — || 28 || 10
|
 BPI: Silver
| rowspan="4" | The Night the Sun Came Up|-
! scope="row" |"In the Dark"
| rowspan="2" | 2011
| 11 || 1 || 2 || 41 || 13 || 22 || 33 || 37 
|
 RIAA: Platinum
|-
! scope="row" |"Naked"(with Enrique Iglesias)
| 99 || 2 || 30 || — || 54 || 26 || — || —
|
|-
! scope="row" |"In My Trunk"(featuring 2 Chainz) 
| 2012
| — || — || — || — || — || — || — || —  
|
|-
! scope="row" |"Kiss It"(featuring Sage the Gemini) 
|2013
| — || — || 34 || — || — || — || — || —  
|
| 
|-
! scope="row" |"Honey Dip"
| 2014
| — || — || 61 || — || 85 || — || — || —
|
| Bittersweet July|-
! scope="row" |"Parade"
| 2015
| — || 50 || — || — || — || — || — || — 
|
| Bittersweet July, Pt. 2|-
! scope="row" |"#1"(featuring Nef the Pharaoh)
|2016
| — || — || 15 || — || — || — || — || —
|
| 
|-
! scope="row" |"All I Wanna Do"
| rowspan="2" |2017
| — || — || 46 || — || — || — || — || —
|
| rowspan="2" | I Only See You When I'm Dreamin'|-
! scope="row" |"Come at Me"
| — || — || — || — || — || — || — || —
|-
! scope="row" |"Mango"
| rowspan="3" | 2020
| — || — || — || — || — || — || — || —
|
| rowspan="4" 
|-
! scope="row" |"Follow My Lead"
| — || — || — || — || — || — || — || —
|-
! scope="row" |"Bom Dia"
| — || — || — || — || — || — || — || —
|
|-
! scope="row" |"Menina Bonita"
|2021
| — || — || — || — || — || — || — || —
|
|-
! scope="row" |"Y COMO YO"
| rowspan="2" | 2022
| — || — || — || — || — || — || — || —
|
| rowspan="2" | TBA
|-
! scope="row" |"MAMI PAPI"
| — || — || — || — || — || — || — || —
|-
| colspan="12" style="font-size:90%" | "—" denotes a recording that did not chart or was not released in that territory.
|}Note''

As featured artist

Promotional singles
 "Fireball" (2009)
 "Booty Bounce" (2010)
 "Lightspeed" (2011)
 "Take Her from You" (2012)
 "Kids" (2014)
 "The Night Is Young" (2014)
 "Drunk Texting" (2017)
 "Trouble" (2017)
 "Down For Me" (2018)
 "Rock On It" (2018)
 "Girls Don't Lie" (2018)
 "Clean Break" (2018)

Guest appearances

Music videos

As lead artist

As featured artist

Guest appearances

References

Discographies of American artists
Pop music discographies